Sten Priinits (born 10 November 1987) is an Estonian fencer.

He was born in Haapsalu. In 2017 he graduated from Tallinn University in physical education.

He began his fencing career in 1994, coached by his mother Helen Nelis-Naukas and uncle Peeter Nelis. His grandfather was fencer and coach Endel Nelis. He won silver medal at 2015 European Fencing Championships in team épée. He is multiple-times Estonian champion. Since 2009 he is a member of Estonian national fencing team.

References

Living people
1987 births
Estonian male épée fencers
Tallinn University alumni
Sportspeople from Haapsalu
20th-century Estonian people
21st-century Estonian people